Partnership for America's Health Care Future (PAHCF) is an alliance of American hospital, health insurance, and pharmaceutical lobbyists committed to preventing legislation that would lead to single-payer healthcare, expanding Medicare, or creating Medicare for All in particular. 

It purports to support expansion of the Affordable Care Act.

History 
Founded in June 2018 by the Federation of American Hospitals, America’s Health Insurance Plans, and the Pharmaceutical Research and Manufacturers of America, the Washington, DC-based partnership now includes the American Hospital Association and the Blue Cross Blue Shield Association. PAHCF has been labeled a "dark money" organization and an "insurance industry front group" by The Intercept, The American Prospect, Iowa Starting Line and Common Dreams. 

In November 2018, PAHCF planning documents were leaked to the media.

In December 2019, PAHCF removed all leadership members and biographies from their "about us" page. PAHCF’s executive director is Lauren Crawford Shaver.

In mid-2020, the American Medical Association left PAHCF.

References

External links

PAHCF YouTube channel

2018 establishments in the United States
Organizations established in 2018
Health industry trade groups based in the United States
Medical and health organizations based in Washington, D.C.
Lobbying organizations in the United States
Election campaigning
Campaign finance in the United States
Secrecy

2018 establishments in Washington, D.C.